The 1987–88 season was the 64th season in the existence of AEK Athens F.C. and the 29th consecutive season in the top flight of Greek football. They competed in the Alpha Ethniki and the Greek Cup. The season began on 6 September 1987 and finished on 15 May 1988.

Overview

The final year of the presidency of Andreas Zafiropoulos, finally found AEK Athens at the second place of the league, behind AEL. The season was overshadowed by various non-competitive cases, the "Tsingov case", the "Ballis-Papadopoulos case" and the "Vosdos case". In the summer of 1987, AEK returned to the Nea Filadelfeia Stadium and was called to carry on without the club's legend, Thomas Mavros and as well as Håkan Sandberg. On the other hand, some useful players were acquired such as Savvidis, Nielsen and Vasilakos. Led by Todor Veselinović and with Panathinaikos and Olympiacos out of the title race early on, the team had a good presence and was in the claiming of the championship, but eventually lost it to the strong at that time AEL. The best players of the season for AEK were Manolas, Nielsen, Savvidis, Vasilakos, Janjanin and Patikas. Henrik Nielsen with 21 goals finished the season as the league's top scorer. The greatest victory of the season was the 7–1 at home against Veria.

However, the "Tsingov case" played crucial role in the outcome of the championship. The Bulgarian footballer, Georgi Tsingov of AEL was tested positive in a dropping test after the match against Panathinaikos. The court decision was as the regulation predicted and punished AEL by zeroing them for that match, 2 points deduction and punishment of the player which brought AEK to the first place of the table. AEL appealed and their fans were revolted by blocking the highway, closing railway lines among other things. Before the appeal was heard the then Minister of Sports, Sifis Valyrakis changed the regulation "overnight", which predicted in cases of doping a footballer, only the footballer would be punished and not the club. So the points were returned back to AEL and finally won the championship. Essentially, AEK was entitled to win the championship on "papers", but AEL was a worthy champion, inside the football pitch and the club's mentality and principles are such that did not allow them to proceed in such actions.

Another scandal of the season was the "Vosdos case". The president of Panachaiki, Aris Loukopoulos, denounced AEK for an attempt to bribe the defender of the team, Leonidas Vosdos, before the match between the two teams at Patras. The footballer himself stated that no one approached him, the judges concluded that the story was an "invention" of Loukopoulos to create a climate of tension in view of the match and the president of Panachaiki was punished.

Noteworthy were also the incidents in the last match of the season	at Nea Filadelfeia against Iraklis. The ultras stand had enough with Zafiropoulos, who was considered unable to lift the "weight" of handling the club, but the tension that existed did not justify the following events. Riot police, in an incomprehensible decision, entered the ultras stand and beat whoever stood in front of them which resulted in very heated encounters with the ultras. There were many who believe that Zafiropoulos influenced the police officers to act in this way.

In the Cup, AEK were eliminated at the round of 16 by Olympiacos. In the first match at Karaiskakis Stadium, AEK got a significant result with 1–1. On the eve of the rematch, a big scandal broke out as the former AEK footballer, Dinos Ballis visited at the hotel where the team were located with a bouquet for the goalkeeper, Theologis Papadopoulos and created strong suspicions that he was trying to bribe him. The match took place, with Olympiacos winning 1–3 and the story continued in the courts. The Koskotas brothers were accused of trying to bribe Papadopoulos and Vasilakos through Ballis, while many AEK fans believe that AEK was involved in the whole case. Eventually, in a very strange court decision, the only one who was punished for the whole case was Ballis for attempted bribery.

Players

Squad information

NOTE: The players are the ones that have been announced by the AEK Athens' press release. No edits should be made unless a player arrival or exit is announced. Updated 30 June 1988, 23:59 UTC+3.

Transfers

In

Summer

Out

Summer

Loan out

Winter

Renewals

Overall transfer activity

Expenditure
Summer:  ₯40,000,000

Winter:  ₯0

Total:  ₯40,000,000

Income
Summer:  ₯0

Winter:  ₯0

Total:  ₯0

Net Totals
Summer:  ₯40,000,000

Winter:  ₯0

Total:  ₯40,000,000

Pre-season and friendlies

Alpha Ethniki

League table

Results summary

Results by Matchday

Fixtures

Greek Cup

Matches

Round of 32

Round of 16

Statistics

Squad statistics

! colspan="9" style="background:#FFDE00; text-align:center" | Goalkeepers
|-

! colspan="9" style="background:#FFDE00; color:black; text-align:center;"| Defenders
|-

! colspan="9" style="background:#FFDE00; color:black; text-align:center;"| Midfielders
|-

! colspan="9" style="background:#FFDE00; color:black; text-align:center;"| Forwards
|-

! colspan="9" style="background:#FFDE00; color:black; text-align:center;"| Left during Winter Transfer Window
|-

|}

Disciplinary record

|-
! colspan="14" style="background:#FFDE00; text-align:center" | Goalkeepers

|-
! colspan="14" style="background:#FFDE00; color:black; text-align:center;"| Defenders

|-
! colspan="14" style="background:#FFDE00; color:black; text-align:center;"| Midfielders

|-
! colspan="14" style="background:#FFDE00; color:black; text-align:center;"| Forwards

|-
! colspan="14" style="background:#FFDE00; color:black; text-align:center;"| Left during Winter Transfer Window

|}

References

External links
AEK Athens F.C. Official Website

AEK Athens F.C. seasons
AEK Athens